Ouderkerk is a former municipality in the western Netherlands, in the province of South Holland. Since 2015 it has been a part of the municipality of Krimpenerwaard.

It was formed on 1 January 1985, after a municipal reorganization.

The former municipality of Ouderkerk consisted of the population centres Gouderak, Lageweg, Ouderkerk aan den IJssel, and IJssellaan, all situated along the Hollandse IJssel river.

Topography

Dutch Topographic map of the former municipality of Ouderkerk, 2013.

References

External links
Official website

Municipalities of the Netherlands disestablished in 2015
Former municipalities of South Holland
Krimpenerwaard